Maria Isabel Aboim Inglez (19021963) was a teacher, feminist, and campaigner against the authoritarian Estado Novo regime in Portugal. She was arrested for her political activities on three occasions.

Early life
Maria Isabel Hahnemann Saavedra de Aboim Inglez (or Inglês) was born in the Portuguese capital of Lisbon on 7 January 1902 and grew up in that city. She came from a middle-class family, the daughter of daughter of Elisa Augusta Hahnemann and Juan Saavedra. Her father, of Spanish origin but a naturalized Portuguese, was a republican and an atheist and his views seemed to have influenced those of his daughter. At college, she met Carlos Aboim Inglez, three years her elder, and they married when she was 20. She did not resume her studies until after her fifth child was born, when she was 34, enrolling in the Faculty of Letters at the University of Lisbon and graduating with high marks. She was then invited to become a teaching assistant at the university but had to decline because of the need to look after her children. Two years later she submitted a thesis on the topic of "The Influence of Discoveries in Portuguese Society".

Teaching and activism
Aboim Inglez then started a school with her husband, called Colégio Fernão de Magalhães (Ferdinand Magellan School). In time, her teaching skills became widely known, and she attracted pupils from Lisbon's upper classes, who studied alongside children from the poorer parts of the school's neighbourhood. She became an active member of the National Council of Portuguese Women and of the Associação Feminina Portuguesa para a Paz (Portuguese Women's Association for Peace -AFPP). In 1941 the offer of a position at the university was renewed and she became a professor of Ancient Philosophy and the History of Medieval Philosophy. In March 1942 her husband died. Soon after that, and facing political pressure for her views, she was forced to give up the position at the university. When José Norton de Matos was a candidate for president in 1949 she travelled the country speaking at election rallies in most major cities. At one rally she was told by the police that, if she spoke, they would arrest her son, Carlos Aboim Inglez. She did speak, and he was arrested. He would go on to be arrested on numerous occasions, as a member of the Portuguese Communist Party.

On 11 February 1949, her school was definitively closed in retaliation for the prominent role she had been assuming in the opposition. In addition to campaigning for Norton, she had been the first woman to be on the central committee of the Movement of Democratic Unity (MUD) between 1946 and 1948. This was a quasi-legal platform of opposition organizations. Because she was recognized as a pioneer in the teaching of Sociology in Portugal, she had been invited to teach a course on General Sociology at the Technical Nursing School of the Portuguese Institute of Oncology. She only managed to run this course in 1947 and 1948, because in 1949 she was banned by the government from continuing to teach any classes, and the authorities made it impossible for her to find any other teaching job. Unable to teach, she set up a dressmaker's workshop, gave private lessons, did translations, and anything else she could find to make money. With influence from her friends, she was offered a teaching position at a Brazilian university, but was denied a passport by the Portuguese government, news of this denial not reaching her until she had sold most of the contents of her home. Government persecution extended to her daughters. Maria Luísa, a painter, had the diploma that allowed her to teach drawing classes withdrawn and Margarida, an agronomist, was prevented from remaining in the civil service.

Arrests
She was arrested briefly for the first time at the age of 44. In January 1948, when she was 46, Aboim Inglez was arrested again, for distributing copies of MUD propaganda, and was detained for two months. Her third arrest took place while she was an observer in a court when political prisoners were being tried. The judge had her detained for three days for showing a "lack of respect". In 1957, she was a member of the organizing committee for the candidature of Arlindo Vicente for the presidency of the Republic. After he withdrew in support of Humberto Delgado, she supported Delgado. In June 1959, her son, Carlos, was sentenced to 8 years in prison and, in 1960, she was beaten in Caxias prison when she went to visit him. For the 1961 national election she was invited to be on the list of opposition candidates, but her name was removed by the authorities because her political rights had been withdrawn earlier.

Death
Maria Isabel Aboim Inglez died on 7 March 1963. She was driving when she felt ill, pulled over to the side of the road and passed away. Her name is now part of the Toponymy of Almada, Lisbon, and Moita.

References

Portuguese anti-fascists
Prisoners and detainees of Portugal
1902 births
1963 deaths